Gamliel HaKohen Rabinowitz (Rappaport) is a rosh yeshiva of Shaar Hashamayim Yeshiva in Jerusalem, Israel. He is a recognized  expert in Jewish Law and Kabbalah.

Family
Rabinowitz is the son of Rabbi Levi HaKohen Rabinowitz (1920-2015), author of Maadanei Hashulchan and Maadanei Malakhim, and grandson of Rabbi Gamliel Rabinowitz, a rosh yeshiva in Kishinev and posek in the court of the Chortkover Rebbe, Rabbi Dovid Moshe Friedman. His family possesses rare documentation attesting to their status as Kohanim, tracing their ancestry back to the Shach. The family surname was originally Rappaport; the name was changed in response to a Russian government decree that conscripted all second sons for the Imperial Russian Army.

Personal
He resides in the Zikhron Moshe neighborhood of Jerusalem.

Published works

 - Commentary on the kavanah of saying Shema Yisroel.

 - Commentary on Purim
 - Commentary on the Torah

References

External links
Books by Gamliel Rabinowitz

Haredi rabbis in Israel
Rosh yeshivas
Kohanim writers of Rabbinic literature
Living people
Kabbalists
Year of birth missing (living people)